The Mississippi State Bulldogs women's basketball program represents Mississippi State University in Starkville, Mississippi, in women's NCAA Division I basketball. The Bulldogs play in the Southeastern Conference. The program is notable for ending the UConn Huskies record 111-game winning streak by beating them 66-64 in overtime in the Final Four of the 2017 NCAA tournament. The buzzer beater shot that put the Bulldogs in front of the Huskies came from the smallest player on the court, the 5-foot-5 inch junior, Morgan William.

Head coaches

Player awards

National awards

Players 
USBWA Freshman of the Year
LaToya Thomas – 2000
Senior CLASS Award
LaToya Thomas – 2003
Frances Pomeroy Naismith Award
Tan White – 2005
 Ann Meyers Drysdale Award
Victoria Vivians – 2018
 Naismith Defensive Player of the Year
Teaira McCowan – 2018
 Elite 90 Award (top GPA among upperclass players at the Final Four)
Jordan Danberry – 2018

Coaches
Naismith Award
Vic Schaefer – 2018
WBCA National Coach of the Year
Vic Schaefer – 2018

SEC awards
Player of the Year
LaToya Thomas – 2002, 2003
Teaira McCowan – 2019
Freshman of the Year
LaToya Thomas – 2000
Defensive Player of the Year
Armelie Lumanu – 2010  
Martha Alwal – 2014
Teaira McCowan – 2018, 2019
6th Woman of the Year
Teaira McCowan – 2017

Gillom Trophy

All-Americans

Postseason

NCAAW tournament results
The Bulldogs have appeared in the NCAA tournament 10 times. Their combined record is 24–12.

WNIT / NWIT tournament results
The Bulldogs have appeared in the WNIT and its predecessor the NWIT 7 times with a combined record of 6-8.

See also
Mississippi State Lady Bulldogs basketball statistical leaders

References

External links